Roger Matakamikamica is a Fijian rugby league footballer who represented Fiji in the 2000 World Cup.

He later played rugby union for the Fraser Coast Mariners in the Sunshine Coast Rugby Union competition.

References

Living people
Fiji national rugby league team players
Fijian rugby league players
Fijian rugby union players
I-Taukei Fijian people
Year of birth missing (living people)